Siliconn City  is a 2017 Kannada-language action film directed by Murali Gurappa, in his directing debut. The film features Srinagar Kitty, Anil Siddhu, Suraj Gowda, Kavya Shetty and Ekta Rathod in the lead roles. The film is a remake of Tamil film Metro (2016).

 The film was released in around 200 screens across Karnataka on 16 June 2017.

Plot
The film begins with Sanjay (Srinagar Kitty) along with his friend locking up an unknown man and torturing him with a camera filming the whole incident. The movie then turns to a flashback, where Sanjay narrates how happy he and his family was. Sanjay who is working in an advertising agency along with his girlfriend Prerana (Kavya Shetty) is the eldest son of a retired Police Head-constable (Ashok) and a home-maker (Thulasi) and has a brother named Karthik (Suraj) who is an engineering student. Sanjay's middle-class family life also has his friend (Chikkanna) mingling as one of the family members. A problem begins when Karthik, who is pressured by his girlfriend Shobha (Ekta) to get an expensive bike, persuades his family to get him a bike. Though hesitant at first, they agree to get him the bike of his choice at the earliest. However, Sanjay is unable to get a loan from his owner (Nagendra Shah). The delay in getting his bike and seeing his classmate James (Girish) spending casually makes him curious to know what he does for money. This is when he is introduced to the heinous crime of chain snatching and is introduced to Mani (Anil Siddhu) who is heading a gang of young college going chain snatchers. Karthik joins the gang and starts to earn through chain snatching and gets all the things he wants.

The plot turns when Karthik decides to do these crimes alone without having to give any commission to Mani (Anil Siddhu). Though hesitant at first, the others join him when 2 of the boys get caught by police and Mani (Anil Siddhu) doesn't come to their aid. Karthik goes back to his house to get a chain recently snatched by him, only to find his mom with the chain and all the other gadgets he owns without his parents' knowledge. An argument begins and Karthik pushes his mother to death. Sanjay comes home to realize his mother's death. When the police inspector (Ramesh Pandit) is unable to track the murderers, Sanjay vows to avenge the loss of his mother not realising that his own brother is the culprit. What happens next forms the latter part of the movie.

Cast
 Srinagar Kitty as Sanjay
 Kavya Shetty as Prerana
 Suraj Gowda as Karthik
 Ekta Rathod
 Anil Siddhu as Mani
 Chikkanna as Ravish
 Giri as James
 Ashok
 Thulasi Shivamani
 Nagendra Shah
 Ramesh Pandit

Soundtrack

Anoop Seelin has composed the music for the soundtrack of the film.

References

2017 films
2010s Kannada-language films
Indian crime thriller films
Indian crime drama films
Kannada remakes of Tamil films
2017 directorial debut films
Films scored by Anoop Seelin
2017 crime drama films
2017 crime thriller films